The 2015 Fukuoka International Women's Cup was a professional tennis tournament played on outdoor grass courts. It was the fifteenth edition of the tournament and part of the 2015 ITF Women's Circuit, offering a total of $50,000 in prize money. It took place in Fukuoka, Japan, on 4–10 May 2015.

Singles main draw entrants

Seeds 

 1 Rankings as of 27 April 2015

Other entrants 
The following players received wildcards into the singles main draw:
  Ayumi Morita
  Chihiro Muramatsu
  Makoto Ninomiya
  Akiko Yonemura

The following players received entry from the qualifying draw:
  Magdalena Fręch
  Miyu Kato
  Miki Miyamura
  Akiko Omae

Champions

Singles

 Kristýna Plíšková def.  Nao Hibino, 7–5, 6–4

Doubles

 Naomi Broady /  Kristýna Plíšková def.  Eri Hozumi /  Junri Namigata, 6–3, 6–4

External links 
 2015 Fukuoka International Women's Cup at ITFtennis.com
 Official website 

2015 ITF Women's Circuit
2015
2015 in Japanese women's sport
2015 in Japanese tennis